The Blue Mountains is a town in Grey County, southwestern Ontario, Canada, located where the Beaver River flows into Nottawasaga Bay. It is named for the Blue Mountain, and hence the economy of the town is centred on tourism, particularly on the Blue Mountain ski resort and the private Georgian Peaks, Osler, Craigleith and Alpine Ski Clubs.

The town was formed on January 1, 2001, when the Town of Thornbury was amalgamated with the Township of Collingwood. Thornbury is home to the architecturally unique L.E. Shore Memorial Library, named after the founding partner of the architectural practice of Shore Tilbe Irwin + Partners, and designed by the firm.

During the Southern Ontario Tornado Outbreak of 2009, a tornado passed through the Blue Mountains area on August 20. The  tornado passed by Thornbury and hit Craigleith before moving out onto Georgian Bay.

Ravenna is the setting for the novel Ravenna Gets by author Tony Burgess.

Recreation
The Blue Mountains has a host of recreational activities for all the seasons. Most notably is the winter skiing, snowboarding, snowshoeing and cross-country skiing. In the summer there is hiking, downhill/cross-country biking, an extravagant mini putt, the Ridge Runner and events such as Met Con Blue. If physical activities are not what you are looking for, The Village at Blue Mountain has a plethora of boutiques, coffee shops, restaurants, hotels and chalets, as well as golf courses within walking distance. Less than a 5-minute drive away there is the Scandinave Spa which situated on 25 acres of natural Ontario birch, as well as the Scenic Caves.

Craigleith Provincial Park is located along Highway 26 near Blue Mountain resort.

The Bruce Trail passes through sections of the town. The Kolapore area for mountain biking and cross-country skiing, Metcalfe Rock which is popular with rock climbers as well as the Duncan Crevice Caves Nature Reserve are in the area as well.

Communities
The primary population centre is Thornbury. Additionally the town's territory also includes the communities of Banks,  Camperdown, Castle Glen Estates, Christie Beach, Clarksburg, Craigleith, Duncan, Gibraltar, Swiss Meadows, Heathcote, Kolapore, Little Germany, Lora Bay, Loree, Ravenna, Red Wing, Slabtown, and Victoria Corners.

Thornbury 

Thornbury was first incorporated in 1831 and divided from Collingwood Township in 1887 as a separate administration. This existed until 2001 when it remerged with Collingwood Township to form Town of The Blue Mountains municipality. The town was a shipping and processing centre for local agricultural produce especially apples through its harbour on Georgian Bay, Lake Huron. There was also a small fishing fleet that operated from the harbour and the post office dates from 1854.

Rail service reached Thornbury on September 2, 1872, when the Northern Railway of Canada's North Grey Railway was built westward through Grey County from Collingwood to Meaford; the line reached Meaford later that year, in December. The line was originally planned to extend all the way to Owen Sound, but this vision went unrealized due to factors such as terrain, financial limitations, and competition from the Toronto, Grey and Bruce Railway, which reached Owen Sound in 1873. The railway was later part of the Grand Trunk Railway and Canadian National Railways (CNR) systems. Thereafter, it became known as the CN Meaford Subdivision. Regular passenger service ceased in 1960; the line itself was abandoned in 1985.

Many large late nineteenth century houses on tree lined streets characterize the town suburbs. Thornbury is home to the architecturally unique L.E. Shore Memorial Library, built in 1995 and named after the founding partner of the architectural practice of Shore Tilbe Irwin + Partners who designed it. In more recent years, Thornbury has become a winter and summer destination for individuals from across Ontario to vacation. The town also holds an annual Canada Day celebration that takes place on the main street.

Climate

Demographics 

Population trend:
 Population total in 1996: 5667
 Collingwood (township): 3904
 Thornbury (town): 1763
 Population in 1991:
 Collingwood (township): 3390
 Thornbury (town): 1646

Notable residents
 Cecil Dillon – NHL hockey player of the 1930s
 Captain Charles Stuart – Anglo-American abolitionist who helped freed slaves make their way to Ontario via the Underground Railroad
 Walter Trier - Czech-German illustrator

Images

See also
List of townships in Ontario

References

External links

Towns in Ontario
Populated places on Lake Huron in Canada
Lower-tier municipalities in Ontario
Municipalities in Grey County